Zoran Simović (Cyrillic: Зоран Симовић; born 2 November 1954) is a former Yugoslav and Montenegrin footballer who played as a goalkeeper.

Simović was named the Yugoslav Footballer of the Year in 1983. He also won the Turkish Footballer of the Year award for three consecutive years (1985, 1986, and 1987).

Club career
Born in Mojkovac, PR Montenegro, Simović moved with his family to Kruševac, PR Serbia in 1965. He played for Napredak Kruševac during the 1970s, helping them gain promotion to the Yugoslav First League on two occasions (1975–76 and 1977–78). In 1980, Simović was transferred to Hajduk Split. He helped the club win the Yugoslav Cup in the 1983–84 season.

In 1984, Simović moved abroad to Turkey and signed with Galatasaray. He spent six seasons at the club and won four trophies, including back-to-back national championships (1986–87 and 1987–88). In total, Simović made 192 league appearances and scored once for Galatasaray, converting a penalty kick in a 6–0 home win over Kahramanmaraşspor in April 1989.

International career
Simović made his debut for Yugoslavia in an October 1983 Euro qualifier against Norway and would go on to earn a total of 10 caps. He was the team's first-choice goalkeeper at UEFA Euro 1984, making his final international appearance against hosts France.

Career statistics

Honours

Club
Napredak Kruševac
 Yugoslav Second League: 1975–76, 1977–78
Hajduk Split
 Yugoslav Cup: 1983–84
Galatasaray
 1.Lig: 1986–87, 1987–88
 Turkish Cup: 1984–85
 Turkish Super Cup: 1987, 1988

Individual
 Yugoslav Footballer of the Year: 1983
 Turkish Footballer of the Year: 1985, 1986, 1987

References

External links
 
 
 

1954 births
Living people
People from Mojkovac
Serbs of Montenegro
Yugoslav footballers
Association football goalkeepers
Yugoslavia international footballers
UEFA Euro 1984 players
FK Napredak Kruševac players
HNK Hajduk Split players
Galatasaray S.K. footballers
Yugoslav Second League players
Yugoslav First League players
Süper Lig players
Yugoslav expatriate footballers
Expatriate footballers in Turkey
Yugoslav expatriate sportspeople in Turkey